Parliamentary elections were held in the Maldives on 19 November 1999. As there were no political parties at the time, all 127 candidates ran as independents. Voter turnout was 77.4%.

Results

References

Maldives
Parliamentary
Elections in the Maldives
Non-partisan elections
Maldives
Election and referendum articles with incomplete results